Rosa-Linda Fregoso is the Professor and former Chair of Latin American and Latino Studies at the University of California, Santa Cruz.

Biography
Fregoso was born in Corpus Christi, Texas.  
She received her Bachelor of Journalism degree from the University of Texas at Austin, and her Ph.D. in Comparative Studies:  Language, Society and Culture from the University of California, San Diego, where she studied under American media critic and scholar, Herbert Schiller, and literary scholar, Rosaura Sánchez.

Before pursuing a career in academia, she was a television and radio journalist.  From 1977-79, she produced and hosted Telecorpus, a daily talk show that aired on KORO-TV in Corpus Christi.  She later moved to Austin, Texas, and from 1979–82, she produced and hosted a weekly radio program, The Mexican American Experience, for the Longhorn Radio Network and KUT-FM (a National Public Radio affiliate).  The Mexican-American Experience was the first nationally syndicated radio program dealing with Mexican-American issues to air on public and commercial radio programs.  It was the predecessor to KUT-FM's Latino USA (launched in 1993), a radio program that Fregoso contributed to as a film critic in its early years.

Awards and honors
Fregoso has won a number of honors and awards, including a Ford Foundation Postdoctoral Fellowship (1990); the Rockefeller Foundation Resident Scholar award (1997); and the MLA Book Prize (2004) for meXicana encounters:  The Making of Social Identities on the Borderlands.

Fregoso currently lives in Oakland, California.

Published works

Books
Terrorizing Women:  Feminicide in the Américas (2010), co-edited with Cynthia Bejarano, Duke University Press.  
meXicana encounters:  The Making of Social Identities on the Borderlands (2003), University of California Press.  
Lourdes Portillo:  The Devil Never Sleeps and Other Films (2001), University of Texas Press.  
Miradas de mujer (1998), co-edited with Norma Iglesias.  
The Bronze Screen:  Chicana and Chicano Film Culture (1993), University of Minnesota Press.

Chapters in books
(2009) "Lupe Vélez: Queen of the Bs," From Bananas to Buttocks: The Latina Body in Popular Film and Culture, edited by Myra Mendible, Austin:  University of Texas Press.
(2007) "Fantasy Heritage: Tracking Latina Bloodlines," Latino Studies Companion, edited by Juan Flores and Renato Rosaldo, Blackwell Press.
(2006) "Toward a Planetary Civil Society", Women in the U.S.-Mexico Borderlands:  Structural Violence and Agency in Everyday Life, edited by Denise Segura and Patricia Zavella, Duke University Press.
(2003) "Reproduction and Miscegenation on the Borderlands: Mapping the Maternal Body of Tejanas", Chicana Feminisms: A Critical Reader, co-edited with Aída Hurtado, Olga Nájera-Ramírez, Norma Klahn and Pat Zavella, Duke University Press.
(2003) "Julia Alvarez, In the Time of the Butterflies," Reading U.S. Latina Writers, edited by Alvina Quintana, Palgrave MacMillan. (Paperback edition 2005)
(2001) "California Filming: Re-imagining the Nation," Parallels and Intersections: A Remarkable History of Women Artists in California 1950–2000, edited by Diana Fuller, University of California Press.
(2001) "Devils and Ghosts, Mothers and Immigrants: A Critical Retrospective of the Works of Lourdes Portillo", Lourdes Portillo: The Devil Never Sleeps and Other Films, edited by Rosa Linda Fregoso, Austin:  University of Texas Press, pp. 81–101.
(1999) "Sacando los Trapos al Sol (Airing Dirty Laundry) in Lourdes Portillo's 'The Devil Never Sleeps'", Redirecting the Gaze: Third World Women Filmmakers, edited by Diana Robin and Ira Jaffe, SUNY Press.

Selected articles
(2010) "Witnessing and the Poetics of Corporality", Kalfou, Vol. 1, No. 1, pp. 21–31.
(2010) "Maquilapolis: An Interview with Vicky Funari and Sergio de la Torre" (Interview and Introduction), Camera Obscura, Vol. 25, No. 2, pp. 173–81.
(2009) "Las queremos vivas!" La política y la cultura de los derechos humanos, Debate Feminista, Vol. 39, pp. 209–243, Mexico City.
(2007) "The Disasters of Border Crossing" (Internet news blog), Truthdig.  (Posted on September 7, 2007.)
(2007) "We Want Them Alive!: The Culture and Politics of Human Rights" (Keynote Address), Berkeley Journal of Gender, Law & Justice (formerly Berkeley Women's Law Journal), Vol. 22, pp. 367–79.
(2006) "’We Want Them Alive!’: The Politics and Culture of Human Rights," Social Identities, Vol. 12, No. 2 (March issue).
(2006) "The Complexities of 'Feminicide' on the Border", Color of Violence:  The Incite! Anthology, Incite! Women of Color Against Violence, Cambridge, South End Press, pp. 130–4.
(2006) "Introduction:  Chicano/a Cultural Representations: Reframing Alternative Critical Discourse," The Chicana/o Cultural Studies Reader, edited by Angie Chabram-Dernersesian, London: Routledge, pp. 24–30.
(2000) "Voices Without Echo: The Global Gendered Apartheid," Emergences: Journal for the Study of Media and Composite Cultures, Vol. 10, No. 1.
(1999) "Imagining Multiculturalism: Race and Sexuality on the Tejas Borderlands," The Review of Education/Pedagogy/Cultural Studies, Vol. 21, No. 2.
(1999) "On the Road With Angela Davis," Cultural Studies, Vol. 13, No. 2 (April issue).
(1995) "Homegirls, Cholas, and Pachucas in Cinema: Taking Over the Public Sphere", California History (Fall issue).

References

External links
Deborah Eade, Book Review of Terrorizing Women: Feminicide in the Américas
Barbara Sutton, Book Review of Terrorizing Women: Feminicide in the Américas
Toby Lapan, UC Professor Explores Feminicide in the Americas, Santa Cruz Sentinel, November 14, 2010
Alicia Gaspar de Alba, Book Review of Terrorizing Women: Feminicide in the Américas
Alma Garcia, Book Review of meXicana encounters:  The Making of Social Identities on the Borderlands
Stop Terrorizing Women, website for Terrorizing Women:  Feminicide in the Américas (2010), edited by Rosa Linda Fregoso and Cynthia Bejarano, Duke University Press.  

Living people
American academics of Mexican descent
University of California, Santa Cruz faculty
Moody College of Communication alumni
University of California, San Diego alumni
People from Corpus Christi, Texas
Latin Americanists
American radio journalists
American television talk show hosts
Ford Foundation fellowships
American social sciences writers
Year of birth missing (living people)
20th-century American academics
21st-century American academics
American women academics
Academics from Texas